Agourai is a town in El Hajeb Province, Fès-Meknès, Morocco. According to the 2014 census, it has a population of 16,291.

References

Populated places in El Hajeb Province
Municipalities of Morocco